This Thangal of Sundavilai was the fourth among the Primary Nizhal Thangals. Very little information was known regarding the history of this thangal. The foundation stone for this Thangal was laid on 1849 in the Tamil month of margazhi.

See also

 Pathi
 Nizhal Thangal
 Worship centers of Ayyavazhi

References

 K.Amalan's, Ayya Vaikundar Punitha Varlaru, Akilam Pathippakam, 2000.
 G.Patrick's, Religion and Subaltern Agency, University of Madras, 2003.

Nizhal Thangals